Alangium is a small genus of flowering plants. The genus is included either in a broad view of the dogwood family Cornaceae, or as the sole member of its own family Alangiaceae. Alangium has about 40 species, but some of the species boundaries are not entirely clear. The type species for Alangium is Alangium decapetalum, which is now treated as a subspecies of Alangium salviifolium. All of the species are shrubs or small trees, except the liana Alangium kwangsiense. A. chinense, A. platanifolium, and A. salviifolium are known in cultivation.

Range
The genus consists of small trees, shrubs and lianas, and is native to western Africa, Madagascar, southern and eastern Asia (China, Malaysia, Indonesia, and the Philippines), tropical Australia, the western Pacific Ocean islands, and New Caledonia.
Most of the species are native to tropical and subtropical regions of east and southeast Asia. Five of the species extend well outside of this area. Alangium platanifolium extends from east Asia into Russia. Alangium chinense (sensu lato) extends from southeast Asia to Africa. Alangium salviifolium is the most widespread species, ranging from Africa to Australia, Fiji, and New Caledonia. Alangium villosum occurs from southeast Asia to Australia and the western Pacific Islands. Alangium grisolleoides is endemic to Madagascar and gives the genus a disjunct distribution.

Alangium species are used as food plants by the larvae of some Lepidoptera species in the Geometroidea-Drepanoidea assemblage including engrailed (Geometridae) and the subfamily Cyclidiinae (Drepanidae).

Etymology
The name Alangium is a Latinization, derived from the Malayalam name alangi, which, in Kerala, refers to Alangium salviifolium.
It was named in 1783 by Jean-Baptiste Lamarck in his Encyclopédie Méthodique.

Paleontological record
The wood, fruit, and pollen of Alangium are distinctive. Fossils of Alangium have been recognized from the early Eocene of England and the middle Eocene of western North America. In former times, Alangium was far more widespread than it is today.

Species
 The Plant List recognises 42 accepted species (including infraspecific names):

 Alangium alpinum  
 Alangium barbatum  
 subsp. barbatum  
 subsp. decipiens  
 subsp. faberi  
 Alangium brachyanthum  
 Alangium chinense  
 Alangium chungii  
 Alangium circulare  
 Alangium grisolleoides  
 Alangium havilandii  
 Alangium javanicum  
 var. ebenaceum  
 var. papuanum  
 Alangium kurzii  
 Alangium longiflorum  
 Alangium maliliense  
 Alangium nobile  
 Alangium platanifolium  
 Alangium premnifolium  
 Alangium qingchuanense  
 Alangium ridleyi  
 Alangium rotundifolium  
 Alangium salviifolium  
 subsp. hexapetalum  
 Alangium scandens  
 Alangium sinicum  
 Alangium taiwanianum  
 Alangium tetrandrum  
 Alangium tonkinense  
 Alangium uniloculare  (syn. Alangium griffithii)
 Alangium villosum  
 subsp. bussyanum  
 subsp. ferrugineum  
 var. javanicum  
 subsp. parviflorum  
 subsp. pilosum  
 subsp. polyosmoides  
 subsp. tomentosum  
 subsp. vitiense  
 subsp. warburgianum  
 Alangium yunnanense

Characteristics
Differences from the other genera in Cornaceae include articulated pedicels, subulate bracts, bitegmic seeds and the single-seeded fruit. The entire or lobed leaves are alternate. The bisexual (rarely unisexual) nectariferous flowers are arranged in axillary cymes. The flowers have 4-10 small sepals and 4-10 linear petals. There are 4–40 stamens distributed in a single cycle. The ovary is inferior and bilocular (sometimes unilocular). The fruit is drupe.

A detailed description of Alangium can be found at Flora of China (journal). Detailed botanical illustrations are available for several species.

Taxonomy
In 2011, a phylogenetic analysis of DNA sequences showed that Alangium is sister to Cornus. Since 1939, Alangium has been divided into four sections: Conostigma, Rhytidandra, Marlea, and Alangium. Some authors have raised Marlea and Rhytidandra to generic rank. The intergeneric classification of Alangium will require a few changes.

Traditional uses
One species, Alangium chinense, is considered one of the fifty fundamental herbs in traditional Chinese medicine.

References

External links
 Alangium At:Index Nominum Genericorum At: References At: NMNH Department of Botany At: Research and Collections At: Smithsonian National Museum of Natural History
 Alangium  In:  Volume 1  Of:  Encyclopédie méthodique: botanique  At:  Biodiversity Heritage Library
 List of lower taxa  Alangium.pdf  Alangium  Chinese Plant Names  Alangiaceae  FOC vol. 13  Family List  Flora of China  eFloras
 Alangium At: Plant Names At: IPNI
 CRC World Dictionary of Plant Names: A-C At: Botany & Plant Science At: Life Science At: CRC Press
Germplasm Resources Information Network: Alangium

Flora of Pakistan: Alangium
Flora of Madagascar: Alangium
Flora of China checklist: Alangium

 
Plants used in traditional Chinese medicine
Cornales genera